Lai Tung-kwok, GBS, IDSM, JP (born 12 November 1951 in Hong Kong) is a retired civil servant and principal official who held the position of Secretary for Security of Hong Kong between 2012 and 2017. He previously served as Under Secretary for Security from 2009 to 2012 and Director of Immigration from 2002 to 2008.

Lai joined the Hong Kong government as an Assistant Immigration Officer in 1973. He was promoted to Immigration Officer in 1980, Senior Immigration Officer in 1986, Chief Immigration Officer in 1990, Assistant Principal Immigration Officer in 1992, Principal Immigration Officer in 1995, Senior Principal Immigration Officer in 1997 and to Assistant Director of Immigration in 1999. He was promoted to Deputy Director of Immigration in 2001. Lai was appointed Director of Immigration in 2002. He ceased to be Director of Immigration in 2008 and retired in 2009 when he was succeeded by Simon Peh. In 2009, he was appointed as the Under Secretary for Security. On 1 July 2012, Lai was promoted to Secretary for Security of Hong Kong. As head of the Security Bureau, he was responsible for overseeing most of Hong Kong's disciplined services.

In February 2022, Lai told SCMP that he would be attending the 2022 Two Sessions, as a Hong Kong delegate.

On 5 January 2022, Carrie Lam announced new warnings and restrictions against social gathering due to potential COVID-19 outbreaks. One day later, it was discovered that Lai attended a birthday party hosted by Witman Hung Wai-man, with 222 guests.  At least one guest tested positive with COVID-19, causing all guests to be quarantined. Tung-kwok was warned by Legislative Council president Andrew Leung to not attend any meetings until after finishing his last mandatory Covid-19 test on 22 January 2022. However, he decided to attend the meeting on 19 January 2022, against Leung's orders.

References

External links
 Lai Tung-kwok@am730 

1951 births
Living people
Government officials of Hong Kong
Recipients of the Gold Bauhinia Star
New People's Party (Hong Kong) politicians
Members of the 13th Chinese People's Political Consultative Conference
Members of the National Committee of the Chinese People's Political Consultative Conference
HK LegCo Members 2022–2025
Members of the Election Committee of Hong Kong, 2021–2026